Colton Ryan (born June 10, 1995) is an American actor and singer. He is known for his performance as Conrad "Coco" Roy in the Hulu miniseries The Girl from Plainville (2022), for which he garnered critical acclaim, and for playing Connor Murphy, a role which he understudied in the Broadway musical Dear Evan Hansen and reprised in the 2021 film adaptation. He is also known for originating Gene Laine in Girl from the North Country, and the main role of Samuel on the Apple TV+ series Little Voice.

Early life and acting career
Ryan was born and raised in Lexington, Kentucky. Ryan attended the School for the Creative and Performing Arts (SCAPA) for grades six through twelve, where he majored in theatre. His acting career took off in 2015 while attending Baldwin Wallace University when he played Dickon in the Idaho Shakespeare Festival production of The Secret Garden.

He made his Broadway debut in 2016 as the standby for Evan Hansen, Connor Murphy and Jared Kleinman in Dear Evan Hansen, which he stayed until 2017, when he graduated with his Bachelor of Fine Arts degree from Baldwin Wallace University. That same year, he made his television debut in a guest role on Law & Order: Special Victims Unit and then played the recurring role of J.J. Elkins on the Showtime series Homeland the following year.

In 2019, he originated the role of White Rabbit/Alfred Hallam/March Hare in the Off-Broadway production of Alice By Heart and made his film acting debut in The Social Ones and Adam. In 2020, he starred in the Bob Dylan musical Girl from the North Country as Gene Laine, a role in which he originated in the 2018 Off-Broadway production, but the production was shut down that May due to the COVID-19 pandemic.

In 2020, he starred in the main role of Samuel on the Apple TV+ series Little Voice and as Bruce in the Amazon Studios film Uncle Frank. It was also announced that year that he would reprise the role of Connor Murphy in Stephen Chbosky's film adaptation of Dear Evan Hansen, which premiered as the Opening Night Gala Presentation of the 2021 Toronto International Film Festival, followed by a theatrical release on September 24, 2021.

In 2021, he was cast opposite Elle Fanning in the Hulu drama series The Girl from Plainville based on the death of Conrad Roy. His performance in the series received critical acclaim.

Theatre credits

Filmography
Film

Television

Awards
In 2019, he received a Theatre World Award for Outstanding Debut Performance for Girl from the North Country''.

References

External links
 
 
 

1995 births
21st-century American male actors
American male musical theatre actors
American male film actors
American male television actors
Living people
Baldwin Wallace University alumni
Male actors from Kentucky
People from Lexington, Kentucky
Actors from Lexington, Kentucky
Musicians from Lexington, Kentucky